The spiny pugolovka (Benthophilus spinosus) is a fish of family Gobiidae. Widespread along the southern and eastern coasts of the Caspian Sea. On the east it is common between the island Kulaly and Mangyshlak Peninsula in south. It can reach a length of  TL.

References

Fish of the Caspian Sea
Fish of Central Asia
Benthophilus
Endemic fauna of the Caspian Sea
Fish described in 1877